The cuneiform ma sign, is found in both the 14th century BC Amarna letters and the Epic of Gilgamesh. In the Epic it is also used as the Sumerogram MA, (for Akkadian language "mina", manû, a weight measure, as MA.NA, or MA.NA.ÀM).
 The ma sign is often used at the end of words, besides its alphabetic usage inside words as syllabic ma, elsewhere for m, or a.

The usage of cuneiform ma in the Epic of Gilgamesh, is only exceeded by the usage of a (cuneiform) (1369 times, and 58, A (Sumerogram), versus 1047 times for ma, 6 for MA (Sumerogram)). The high usage for a is partially a result of the prepositional use for a-na-(Akkadian "ana", to, for, etc.); "i", also has an increased prepositional use of i (cuneiform), for Akkadian ina, (i-na), for in, into, etc.

References 

Moran, William L. 1987, 1992. The Amarna Letters. Johns Hopkins University Press, 1987, 1992. 393 pages.(softcover)
 Parpola, 1971. The Standard Babylonian Epic of Gilgamesh, Parpola, Simo, Neo-Assyrian Text Corpus Project, c 1997, Tablet I thru Tablet XII, Index of Names, Sign List, and Glossary-(pp. 119–145), 165 pages.
Rainey, 1970. El Amarna Tablets, 359-379, Anson F. Rainey, (AOAT 8, Alter Orient Altes Testament 8, Kevelaer and Neukirchen -Vluyen), 1970, 107 pages.

Cuneiform signs